The 2007 Nigerian Senate election in Gombe State was held on April 21, 2007, to elect members of the Nigerian Senate to represent Gombe State. Kawu Peto Dukku representing Gombe North, Tawar Umbi Wada representing Gombe South and Audu Idris Umar representing Gombe Central all won on the platform of the Peoples Democratic Party.

Overview

Summary

Results

Gombe North 
The election was won by Kawu Peto Dukku of the Peoples Democratic Party.

Gombe South 
The election was won by Tawar Umbi Wada of the Peoples Democratic Party.

Gombe Central 
The election was won by Audu Idris Umar of the Peoples Democratic Party.

References 

April 2007 events in Nigeria
Gombe State Senate elections
Gom